Catherine Chabot is a Canadian actress, writer and film director. She is most noted for her performance as Chloé Therrien in the 2019 film Compulsive Liar (Menteur), for which she received a Prix Iris nomination for Revelation of the Year at the 22nd Quebec Cinema Awards in 2020.

In 2022, she co-wrote, co-directed and starred in Lines of Escape (Lignes de fuite), a film adapted from her own theatrical stage play. In the same year she was cast in the lead role in La Candidate, a television comedy series about a paper candidate who unexpectedly wins election to public office, which was based partially on the experiences of Ruth Ellen Brosseau and is slated to premiere in 2023.

A 2013 graduate of the Conservatoire d'art dramatique de Montréal, she has also appeared in the television series Mon ex à moi, Victor Lessard and Hôtel, and the film The Guide to the Perfect Family (La guide de la famille parfaite).

References

External links

21st-century Canadian actresses
21st-century Canadian dramatists and playwrights
21st-century Canadian screenwriters
21st-century Canadian women writers
Canadian women dramatists and playwrights
Canadian women screenwriters
Canadian dramatists and playwrights in French
Canadian screenwriters in French
Canadian film actresses
Canadian television actresses
Canadian stage actresses
French Quebecers
Actresses from Quebec
Film directors from Quebec
Screenwriters from Quebec
Living people